Prior to its uniform adoption of proportional representation in 1999, the United Kingdom used first-past-the-post for the European elections in England, Scotland and Wales. The European Parliament constituencies used under that system were smaller than the later regional constituencies and only had one Member of the European Parliament each.

The constituency of Durham was one of them.

From 1979 to 1984, it consisted of the Westminster Parliament constituencies of Bishop Auckland, Chester-le-Street, Consett, Darlington, Durham, Durham North West, Easington, and Houghton-le-Spring. From 1984 to 1999 it consisted of: Bishop Auckland, Blaydon, City of Durham, Darlington, Easington, North Durham, North West Durham, Sedgefield.

Members of the European Parliament

Election results

References

External links
 David Boothroyd's United Kingdom Election Results

Politics of County Durham
1979 establishments in England
1999 disestablishments in England
Constituencies established in 1979
Constituencies disestablished in 1999
European Parliament constituencies in North East England (1979–1999)